T.O.D.A.S.: Television's Outrageously Delightful All-Star Show is a Philippine sketch comedy and variety show. It was aired on IBC from 1980 to 1989.

Cast
 Marlene Feliciano (1980-1985)
 Maribeth Bichara (1980-1989)
 Frieda Fonda (1980-1989)
 Spanky Rigor (1980-1989)
 Richie D'Horsie (1980-1986)
 Jimmy Santos (1987-1989)
 Val Sotto (1980-1989)
 Joey de Leon (1980-1988)
 Redford White (1980-1984)
 Yayo Aguila (1985-1986)

Re-runs
Reruns of the series was aired on IBC from February 11 to July 19, 2019.
Clips from the series was shown on IBC's archival program Retro TV in 2003.

See also
 List of programs previously broadcast by Intercontinental Broadcasting Corporation

References

1980s Philippine television series
1980 Philippine television series debuts
1989 Philippine television series endings
Philippine television sketch shows
Intercontinental Broadcasting Corporation original programming
Filipino-language television shows